The Turpin Grain Elevator, located off U.S. Route 64 in Turpin, Oklahoma, was built in 1925.  It was listed on the National Register of Historic Places in 1983.

It is a wood-frame structure covered by corrugated metal.  It was built by the Light Grain and Milling Company in 1925, on the first building lot in the new town of Turpin, established by arrival of the Beaver, Meade and Englewood Railroad.  It was in use into the late 1960s.

See also
Knowles Grain Elevator, also NRHP-listed in Beaver County

References

Grain elevators
National Register of Historic Places in Beaver County, Oklahoma
Buildings and structures completed in 1925